Mark Steven Portugal (born October 30, 1962) is a former Major League Baseball pitcher who played in the major leagues from 1985 to 1999.

Career
Portugal attended Norwalk High School in Norwalk, California. He was signed by the Minnesota Twins in 1980. In 1984, he went 14–7 for the Orlando Twins of the Southern League and made his major league debut the following season.

Portugal spent the rest of the decade in either AAA or the majors. In 1988, he was traded to the Houston Astros. In 1989, he went 7–1 with a 2.75 earned run average for them and won a spot in the starting rotation. He had his best season in 1993, when he won 18 games, led the National League in winning percentage, and finished sixth in the Cy Young Award voting.

Portugal signed with the San Francisco Giants as a free agent in 1994. Typically a .200 hitter, he led all regular starting pitchers with a .354 batting average in 1994 and won the Silver Slugger Award. The following season, he was traded to the Cincinnati Reds. Portugal played for several teams over the next few years and retired in 2000.

See also
 List of Silver Slugger Award winners at pitcher

References

External links

Pura Pelota (Venezuelan Winter League)

1962 births
Living people
Baseball players from Los Angeles
Boston Red Sox players
Cincinnati Reds players
Elizabethton Twins players
Houston Astros players
Major League Baseball pitchers
Minnesota Twins players
Orlando Twins players
People from Norwalk, California
Philadelphia Phillies players
Portland Beavers players
San Francisco Giants players
Silver Slugger Award winners
Tigres de Aragua players
American expatriate baseball players in Venezuela
Toledo Mud Hens players
Tucson Toros players
Visalia Oaks players
Wisconsin Rapids Twins players